Heteroteucha distephana is a moth of the family Oecophoridae. It is found in Australia, in the states of New South Wales, Queensland and Victoria.

The wingspan is about 10 mm. Adults have yellow forewings, each with a brown band across the middle and a broad brown margin. The hindwings are plain pale brown.

The larvae live in silked dead leaves. They feed on dead leaves of Eucalyptus species.

External links
Australian Insects
Australian Faunal Directory

Moths described in 1884
Heteroteucha